Lepreau may refer to several places and features in Charlotte County, New Brunswick:

Lepreau, an unincorporated community
Lepreau Basin, at mouth of Lepreau River
Lepreau Bay
Lepreau Falls, site of Lepreau Falls Provincial Park
Lepreau Parish, a civil parish
the parish of Lepreau, the local service district for the civil parish
Lepreau River
North Branch Lepreau River
West Branch Lepreau River
Lepreau River Wildlife Management Area
Little Lepreau
Little Lepreau Basin, at mouth of Little Lepreau River
Little Lepreau River
Point Lepreau
Point Lepreau Nuclear Generating Station